Hoàng Anh Tuấn is a former Vietnamese defender. He is currently the coach of U19 Vietnam and Vietnam U17 .

On 23 October 2016, he and U19 Vietnam made the feat of defeating U19 Bahrain in the quarter-finals of the 2016 AFC U-19 Championship to enter the semi-finals of the continental tournament, earning tickets to the 2017 FIFA U-20 World Cup in South Korea. This is also the first time a team of 11 football player of Vietnam participated in a World Cup tournament of FIFA.

He is considered one of Vietnam's most well-qualified coaches. He is also the only Vietnamese coach chosen by the German Football Association (DFB) to attend the A-level (senior) training course in August 2009, at the Hennef Sports School.

In the coaching world, Tuan is very good at foreign languages and should be invited by the Vietnam Football Federation as assistant coach for foreign coaches of the national team.

Honours
Vietnam U19
 AFF U-19 Youth Championship runners-up: 2015; third place: 2016
 AFC U-19 Championship fourth place: 2016

References

Vietnamese football managers
People from Khánh Hòa Province
Living people
1968 births